Federation Cup or Fed Cup is the premier world team competition in women's tennis.

Federation Cup may also refer to:
Capital Football Federation Cup, an Australian territory-based association football tournament
Federation Cup (Bangladesh)
Federation Cup (India), an association football tournament
Federation Cup (Nigeria football), an association football tournament in Lagos
Federation Cup (United Arab Emirates), an association football tournament
Kuwait Federation Cup
Lebanese Federation Cup
Saudi Federation Cup
South Asian Football Federation Cup
South Australian Federation Cup, an Australian state-based association football tournament
Spanish Federation Cup
Turkish Federation Cup
USSR Federation Cup